Eastover is a historic site in Manalapan, Florida. It is located at 1100 South Ocean Boulevard. On December 23, 2002, it was added to the U.S. National Register of Historic Places.

History
The property was built for Harold Stirling Vanderbilt and his wife, Gertrude Conaway Vanderbilt, in 1930. It was designed by Swiss architect Maurice Fatio.

It is currently a private, single-family residence. A portion of the home has been demolished and the land has been subdivided. The estate also includes a detached guest house, built in the mid-1990s.

References
Notes

Bibliography

 Johnson, Shirley. Palm Beach Houses. New York: Rizzoli, 1991. .
 Treanor & Fatio. Recent Florida Work by Treanor & Fatio Architects. Palm Beach: Davies Publishing Co., 1932.

External links
 Eastover at Palm Beach County Property Appraiser
 Movers & Shakers - More Storage Space For CEO Of StorageApps

National Register of Historic Places in Palm Beach County, Florida
Houses in Palm Beach County, Florida
1929 establishments in Florida